Gibberula epigrus is a species of very small sea snail, a marine gastropod mollusk or micromollusk in the family Cystiscidae. It is regarded as a taxon inquirendum.

References

Cystiscidae
Gastropods described in 1865